Deinostigma is a genus in the family Gesneriaceae, native to Vietnam and Southern China. In 2016 the genus was expanded with the transfer of several species that had previously been place in the genus Primulina, to include a total of seven species.

Species

Species include:
Deinostigma cicatricosa (W.T.Wang) D.J.Middleton & Mich.Möller
Deinostigma cycnostyla (B.L.Burtt) D.J.Middleton & H.J.Atkins
Deinostigma cyrtocarpa (D.Fang & L.Zeng) Mich.Möller & H.J.Atkins
Deinostigma eberhardtii (Pellegr.) D.J.Middleton & H.J.Atkins
Deinostigma minutihamata (D.Wood) D.J.Middleton & H.J.Atkins
Deinostigma poilanei (Pellegr.) W.T.Wang & Z.Y.Li
Deinostigma tamiana (B.L.Burtt) D.J.Middleton & H.J.Atkins

References

 
Gesneriaceae genera